Cheadle is a hamlet in Alberta, Canada within Wheatland County.

It is a  turf airstrip run by G. Jackson.

History 
The Canadian Pacific Railway named the community Cheadle for Dr. Walter Butler Cheadle of Milton and Cheadle explorers who traveled across the prairies and Rocky Mountains in the 1860s. Dr. Cheadle and Lord Milton were co-authors of the book "The North-West Passage by Land" (London, 1865), which described their expedition in considerable detail.

A record was made when laying the railroad tracks between Strathmore and Cheadle when the railway was built. "In one hour a mile of steel was laid. And, at the end of the ten-hour working day, the rails were laid to Cheadle, nine miles and 300 feet for a record." The ties had been strung the night before.

There was just one minor building in Cheadle when the early ranchers and homesteaders began to arrive in the late 1890s. It was a post office, store, and boarding home, run by Mrs. Florence Belwer for the CPR section-men. Cheadle began to grow in the years 1906–1916 to a hardware store, barbershop, blacksmith, restaurant, pool hall, dance hall, three grocery stores, water tank, CPR station and section houses, stockyards, lumberyard, two grain elevators, and several residences. The CPR had once planned to locate Ogden Shops in Cheadle.

The arrival of the automobile and another C.P.R. line from Gleichen to Calgary, through Carseland and Dalemead, along with the building of the C.N.R. through Lyalta and Ardenode, quickly halted the growth of Cheadle. A lack of directional sign along Highway 1, indicating Cheadle's location, also contributed to the hamlet's demise. Most travelers became completely unaware of Cheadle's existence, and it was often missed from Alberta maps.

At one time grain was hauled to Cheadle from Carseland. The transport teams ate and rested in Cheadle before returning. This all brought much of the business to Cheadle and raised the total number of grain elevators to 3. By 1971, Cheadle's post office and grocery store closed. It was purchased by Fritz Gosteli, a local acreage owner originally from Switzerland, who transformed the building into a two-story single family residence. There were two main businesses at that time; Risdon's Tomato Enterprise and Ken Hendry's Manufacturing, which was built two years prior. There were only a few residents at that time: Ken & Leona Hendry, Leon & Kay Risdon and family, Tommy Kildea, Doug & Kathy Davies and family, Fritz & Christine Gosteli and family, Mr. & Mrs. H. V. Iles, Dietrich & Regina Volkmann. Between Cheadle and Highway 1 there was Ken and Bev Jones and family, Mr. & Mrs. M. Landru and family, and Mr. & Mrs. H. McElroy and family, and Mr. & Mrs. E. A. Cobb.

Demographics 

Statues 
There is a  statue of a Cheetos corn puff located at 400 Railway Avenue. Unveiled in October 2022, the statue was commissioned by the Cheetos Brand, part of PepsiCo Foods. It is not a permanent fixture, and will leave Cheadle after November 4, 2022, for a tour around Canada.

See also 
List of communities in Alberta
List of designated places in Alberta
List of hamlets in Alberta
Wheatland County

References 

Calgary Region
Designated places in Alberta
Hamlets in Alberta
Wheatland County, Alberta